Afaz Uddin Ahmed (born 1925 or 1926; died 18 July 2021) was a Bangladesh Awami League politician and the former member of parliament for Kushtia-1.

Career
Ahmed was elected to parliament from Kushtia-1 as a Bangladesh Awami League candidate in 2008.

Ahmed died from COVID-19 in Dhaka in July 2021, at age 95, during the COVID-19 pandemic in Bangladesh.

References

Awami League politicians
1920s births
2021 deaths
9th Jatiya Sangsad members
People from Kushtia District
Year of birth missing
Deaths from the COVID-19 pandemic in Bangladesh